Anania hortulata, the small magpie, is a species of moth of the family Crambidae. It is found in Europe and North America.

The wingspan is 
The head and thorax are deep ochreous-yellow, black-spotted. Forewings are yellowish-white,
markings blackish ; base blackish, with two ochreous-yellow marks ; a suffused costal streak ; lines thick, first irregular, second tending to form spots, curved, narrowest below middle ; small orbicular and large round discal spots, touching costal streak ; a terminal fascia tending to form spots, edge parallel to second line. Hind wings with colour, second line, and terminal fascia as in forewings ; a blackish discal spot. The larva is whitish ; dorsal line dull green, white-edged ; head and plate of 2 black.

The moth flies from June to July depending on the location.

The larvae feed on Stachys, mint and nettle.

References

External links

 Small magpie at UKmoths
Anania hortulata on Bug Guide
Lepiforum.de

Pyraustinae
Moths described in 1758
Moths of Europe
Moths of North America
Taxa named by Carl Linnaeus